Drag Race Philippines is a Philippine reality competition television series. It is a spin-off of RuPaul's Drag Race. The series is produced by World of Wonder and Fullhouse Asia Production Studios. The series airs on Discovery+ and HBO Go in the Philippines, Crave in Canada, and WOW Presents Plus in the rest of the world.

The series premiered on 17 August 2022. Twelve drag queens competed for the title of "Philippines' First Drag Superstar", a one-year supply of ONE/SIZE Beauty Cosmetics by Patrick Starrr, with a cash prize of ₱1,000,000, powered by Kumu. Precious Paula Nicole won the first season with Marina Summers as runner-up. Lady Morgana was named Miss Congeniality.

A second season (and its companion series) has been announced on 19 October 2022.

Production 
On 17 August 2021, RuPaul announced a casting call for season one of Drag Race Philippines throughout social media.

Judges 
Paolo Ballesteros, also nicknamed as Mawma Pao on the show, is the host and main judge. Jiggly Caliente (contestant on RuPaul's Drag Race season 4 and All Stars season 6) and television personality KaladKaren serving as permanent judges. BJ Pascual, Jon Santos, and Rajo Laurel were served as the alternating judges for the season.

Contestants 

Currently, there has been a total of 12 contestants featured in Drag Race Philippines.

Series overview

Season 1 (2022) 

The cast (which is twelve drag queens) was announced on 27 July 2022. The first season of Drag Race Philippines began airing on 17 August 2022, on Discovery+ and HBO Go in the Philippines and World of Wonder's streaming service WOW Presents Plus internationally. The season ran for 10 episodes and concluded on 12 October 2022. Lady Morgana was voted as Miss Congeniality. Marina Summers was the runner-up, and Precious Paula Nicole was the winner of the first season.

Season 2 (TBA) 
After the first season ended, on 19 October 2022, it was announced by World of Wonder that the Philippine series was renewed for a second season. On 29 October 2022, casting has opened for season two, and the deadline is 1 December 2022.

Drag Race Philippines: Untucked! 
After the teaser trailer for Drag Race Philippines was released, it also announced Drag Race Philippines: Untucked, a companion series similar to RuPaul's Drag Race: Untucked. The companion series showcases the contestants’ conversations, key moments, and deleted footage in a similar documentary format. The behind-the-scenes series began to premiere on 19 August 2022.

On 19 October 2022, it was confirmed that the second season of the companion series has been officially renewed alongside the main series.

Series overview

References 

 
2022 in LGBT history
2022 Philippine television series debuts
Philippine LGBT-related television shows
Philippine reality television series
Philippine television series based on American television series
WOW Presents Plus original programming